Thomas John Perowne (1868–1954) was Archdeacon of Norwich from 1937 until his death on 25 August 1954.

Perowne was born in 1868; educated at Haileybury and Corpus Christi College, Cambridge and ordained in 1893. After curacies in locations including Lowestoft, Kelsale and Norwich he was Vicar of Hindringham from 1913 to 1922. He was Rector of Starston from 1922 to 1945; and Rural Dean of Redenhall from 1927 to 1936.

His father, Thomas Thomason Perowne, also Archdeacon of Norwich, died in 1913.

Family tree

References

1889 births
1954 deaths
20th-century English Anglican priests
People educated at Haileybury and Imperial Service College
Archdeacons of Norwich
Alumni of Corpus Christi College, Cambridge